Klāvs Elsbergs (January 3, 1959 – February 5, 1987) was a Latvian poet and translator. He was the son of Latvian poet Vizma Belševica.

Biography 

Klāvs Elsbergs was born in Riga. His parents were Latvian poet Vizma Belševica and translator Zigurds Elsbergs. In 1977 he started French philology studies in the Latvian University. He graduated in 1982. He was a major translator of French poetry including a collection of poems by Guillaume Apollinaire. Elsbergs also has translated works of Kurt Vonnegut (Slaughterhouse-Five). Also he was one of the founding editors of Avots, an influential intellectual monthly that introduced avant garde and politically charged subjects during the period of Glasnost. In 1978 he married Latvian poet Irēna Auziņa.

Elsbergs was a leading poet of his generation and his poetry is still very popular in Latvia. He published two volumes of his poetry and one was published posthumously.

Klāvs Elsbergs died on February 5, 1987, in an accident. His death is surrounded with rumours and there is even theory, that he was actually murdered.

References
 

1959 births
1987 deaths
Writers from Riga
Latvian male poets
20th-century Latvian poets
20th-century male writers
University of Latvia alumni